Douglas Rae Daw Collier Baillie (27 January 1937 – 19 February 2022) was a Scottish footballer who played as a centre-half in the Scottish Football League and the Football League. He was a backup squad member at Rangers during three of the club's title-winning seasons in the early 1960s, playing a handful of matches in each. He also made over 100 league appearances for both Airdrieonians and Falkirk.

After retiring as a player, Baillie became a football journalist, working for The Sunday Post. Baillie died on 19 February 2022, at the age of 85.

References

External links

Player record at Swindon, Watford 2 Swindon 1

1937 births
2022 deaths
Footballers from South Lanarkshire
Scottish footballers
Association football central defenders
Scotland under-23 international footballers
English Football League players
Scottish Football League players
Falkirk F.C. players
Rangers F.C. players
Douglas Water Thistle F.C. players
Swindon Town F.C. players
Airdrieonians F.C. (1878) players
Third Lanark A.C. players
Dunfermline Athletic F.C. players
Scottish sportswriters
Scottish Junior Football Association players
People from Douglas Water